Ekaterina Kurochkina (born 25 June 1994) is a Russian rower. She competed in the 2020 Summer Olympics.

References

1994 births
Living people
People from Magnitogorsk
Rowers at the 2020 Summer Olympics
Russian female rowers
Olympic rowers of Russia
Sportspeople from Chelyabinsk Oblast